The Madagascar men's national under-18 basketball team is a national basketball team of Madagascar, governed by the Fédération Malagasy de Basket-Ball.
It represents the country in international under-18 (under age 18) basketball competitions.

See also
Madagascar men's national basketball team
Madagascar men's national under-16 basketball team
Madagascar women's national under-16 basketball team

References

External links
Archived records of Madagascar team participations

Basketball teams in Madagascar
Men's national under-18 basketball teams
Basketball